Branko Cvetković (born 5 March 1984) is a retired Serbian professional basketball player. He also represented the Serbian national team internationally. He is 2.00 m (6 ft 6 ¾ in) tall and plays at the shooting guard and small forward positions.

Professional career 
Cvetković came up through youth systems at Spartak Subotica and Borac Čačak. After making a name for himself with the Basketball League of Serbia club FMP Železnik by winning the Adriatic League championship in the 2005–06 season and the Serbian Cup in the 2006–07 season, he signed with CB Girona of the Spanish ACB League for the 2007–08 season. In Girona, he averaged 9.1 points per game in the Spanish League, and 10.1 points per game in the ULEB Cup (now called EuroCup) league, where Girona progressed all the way to the league's final game.

On 2 August 2008, it was announced that Cvetković signed with the Greek EuroLeague club Panionios In April 2009 he joined the Spanish club CAI Zaragoza until the end of the season. In November 2009 he signed open contract with his former club FMP Železnik, but he played only 3 games and then signed with Scavolini Pesaro. In August 2010, he signed with Ukrainian team Donetsk.

In June 2011, he signed a one-year deal with Astana from Kazakhstan. In April 2012, he re-signed with them for one more season. In June 2013, he re-signed again with them for one more season.

On 7 February 2015, Cvetković signed with Montakit Fuenlabrada of the Liga ACB.

In September 2019, Cvetković joined I Came to Play of the amateur 4th-tier Serbian League.

National team career 
Cvetković was member of the Serbian national basketball team at the EuroBasket 2007.

See also 
 List of Serbia men's national basketball team players

References

External links 

 Euroleague.net profile
 Eurobasket.com profile
 FIBA.com profile

1984 births
Living people
Baloncesto Fuenlabrada players
Basket Zaragoza players
BC Astana players
BC Donetsk players
CB Girona players
I Came to Play players
KK Borac Čačak players
KK FMP (1991–2011) players
KK Spartak Subotica players
Guaros de Lara (basketball) players
Liga ACB players
Panionios B.C. players
People from Gračanica, Bosnia and Herzegovina
Serbia men's national basketball team players
Serbian expatriate basketball people in Greece
Serbian expatriate basketball people in Italy
Serbian expatriate basketball people in Lebanon
Serbian expatriate basketball people in Kazakhstan
Serbian expatriate basketball people in Ukraine
Serbian expatriate basketball people in Spain
Serbian expatriate basketball people in Venezuela
Serbian men's basketball players
Serbs of Bosnia and Herzegovina
Small forwards
Victoria Libertas Pallacanestro players
Al Riyadi Club Beirut basketball players